Cherry Hill is one of the southernmost neighborhoods in Baltimore, Maryland.

Geography
Its southern geographic location from the city's center, bounded by the Middle Branch of the Patapsco River to the north, the river's main channel to the east, and railroad tracks, including the tracks of the Baltimore Light Rail system, to the west and Baltimore Highlands, Maryland to the south. Cherry Hill is home to Baltimore's largest public housing project, Cherry Hill Homes, with over 1000 units, private homes and several other low-income apartments throughout the community.

In 2014, Baltimore City Public Schools announced that Maritime Industries Academy, a high school in northeast Baltimore, was moving to Cherry Hill. This was done in part to revamp the Herring Run recreational center in Frankford, the school's  neighborhood. Most Cherry Hill residents agreed with the decision to move the high school to the area, as they needed a high school  for teenage residents to attend, so they can avoid long transportation hours. The high school moving took action for the start of the 2015–2016 school year.

Transportation

The only roads leading in or out of the neighborhood are Hanover Street, Potee Street, Cherry Hill Road and Waterview Avenue. The Maryland Transit Administration (MTA) serves the highly populated area with the need for public transportation by bus routes 26, 71,   and the already noted Baltimore Light Rail at the Cherry Hill light rail stop located on the northwest edge of the neighborhood.

History
The Cherry Hill neighborhood was developed fairly recently in Baltimore's history. Like Armistead Gardens the community was founded as a home for African-American veterans returning from both World War II and the Korean War. Cherry Hill was originally planned to be located in the area now known as "Armsteady Gardens", the first section of public housing was built in 1948... .

In the early and mid-1900s, Cherry Hill was home to an encampment of Roma of Romanian descent. The Roma settled in Cherry Hill because it was undeveloped and on the outskirts of the city. Many of the Roma were in fortune telling and traveled up and down the East Coast, with Baltimore as a central location on the carnival circuit. Due to a series of antiziganist laws passed in the 1920s and 1930s that banned fortune-telling and required a $1,000 fee for nomads to enter the city of Baltimore, the Roma community left Cherry Hill, but soon returned because the laws were rarely enforced.

Economy
Harbor Hospital is based in the eastern edge of the neighborhood.

Cherry Hill is also home to DeBaufre Bakeries, the maker of local icon Berger Cookies.

References

External links
 Cherry Hill Homes
 Harbor Hospital

 
Historic Romani communities
Neighborhoods in Baltimore
Maryland populated places on the Chesapeake Bay
Poverty in Maryland
Romanian-American history
Romani in the United States
Working-class culture in Baltimore